Indolestes indicus is a species of spreadwing in the damselfly family Lestidae.

The IUCN conservation status of Indolestes indicus is "NT", near threatened. The species may be considered threatened in the near future. The IUCN status was reviewed in 2010.

References

Further reading

 

Lestidae
Articles created by Qbugbot
Insects described in 1922